R-spondin-1 is a secreted protein that in humans is encoded by the Rspo1 gene, found on chromosome 1.  In humans, it interacts with WNT4 in the process of female sex development.  Loss of function can cause female to male sex reversal.  Furthermore, it promotes canonical WNT/β catenin signaling.

Structure
The protein has two cysteine-rich, furin-like domains and one thrombospondin type 1 domain.

Function

Sex Development

Early Gonads
RSPO1 is required for the early development of gonads, regardless of sex.  It has been found in mice only eleven days after fertilization.  To induce cell proliferation, it acts synergistically with WNT4.  They help stabilize β-catenin, which activates downstream targets.  If both are deficient in XY mice, there is less expression of SRY and a reduction in the amount of SOX9.  Moreover, defects in vascularization are found.  These occurrences result in testicular hypoplasia.  Male to female sex reversal, however, does not occur because Leydig cells remain normal.  They are maintained by steroidogenic cells, now unrepressed.

Ovaries
RSPO1 is necessary in female sex development.  It augments the WNT/β catenin pathway to oppose male sex development.  In critical gonadal stages, between six and nine weeks after fertilization, the ovaries upregulate it while the testes downregulate it.

Mucositis
Oral mucosa has been identified as a target tissue for RSPO1.  When administered to normal mice, it causes nuclear translocation of β-catenin to this region.  Modulation of the WNT/β catenin pathway occurs through the relief of Dkk1 inhibition.  This occurrence results in increased basal cellularity, thickened mucosa, and elevated epithelial cell proliferation in the tongue.  RSPO1 can therefore potentially aid in the treatment of mucositis, which is characterized by inflammation of the oral cavity.  This unfortunate condition often accompanies chemotherapy and radiation in cancer patients with head and neck tumors.  RSPO1 has also been shown to promote gastrointestinal epithelial cell proliferation in mice.

References

Further reading

External links 
 

Glycoproteins
Extracellular matrix proteins